Idream R. Murthy is an Indian politician and Member of Legislative Assembly of Tamil Nadu. He was elected from Royapuram as an Dravida Munnetra Kazhagam candidate in 2021.

Electoral performance

References 

Tamil Nadu MLAs 2021–2026
Year of birth missing (living people)
Living people
Dravida Munnetra Kazhagam politicians